Marco Falaschi (born 18 September 1987) is an Italian volleyball player, a member of the Italy men's national volleyball team and Polish club ZAKSA Kędzierzyn-Koźle, bronze medalist of World League 2013, Montenegrin Champion (2014).

Career

Clubs
He went to Lotos Trefl Gdańsk in June 2014. He signed a one-year contract. On 19 April 2015 Lotos Trefl Gdańsk, including Falaschi, achieved the Polish Cup 2015. Then he won silver medal of the Polish Championship. In May 2015 he extended his contract with Lotos Trefl Gdańsk until 2016. In season 2016/17 he played for another Polish club GKS Katowice.

Sporting achievements

Clubs

National championships
 2013/2014  Montenegrin Cup, with Budvanska Rivijera Budva
 2013/2014  Montenegrin Championship, with Budvanska Rivijera Budva
 2014/2015  Polish Cup, with Lotos Trefl Gdańsk
 2014/2015  Polish Championship, with Lotos Trefl Gdańsk
 2015/2016  Polish SuperCup 2015, with Lotos Trefl Gdańsk
 2017/2018  Polish Championship, with ZAKSA Kędzierzyn-Koźle

National team
 2013  FIVB World League
 2013  Mediterranean Games

References

External links
 FIVB profile
 PlusLiga player profile

1987 births
Living people
Italian men's volleyball players
Italian expatriates in Poland
Expatriate volleyball players in Poland
Trefl Gdańsk players
Volleyball players at the 2015 European Games
European Games competitors for Italy
ZAKSA Kędzierzyn-Koźle players
Mediterranean Games gold medalists for Italy
Mediterranean Games medalists in volleyball
Competitors at the 2013 Mediterranean Games
People from Santa Croce sull'Arno
21st-century Italian people